Hennessey is a town in Kingfisher County, Oklahoma, United States. The population was 2,131 at the 2010 census, up from 2,058 in 2000.

History

Hennessey is named after Pat Hennessey, an Irish freighter who was killed at the present townsite in April 1874. He was said to have been burned on a wagon wheel, either by native Cheyenne tribesmen or white horse thieves.

The Pat Hennessey Memorial Park can be found at Iowa and Arapaho streets. The location of his body is another story. Pat Hennessey was originally buried next to the location of his death in a shallow grave. Rocks were placed over his body, and teamsters passing by would continue to place markers on his grave. At some point in history Hennessey's body was moved. It is possible his relatives came from Ireland and reclaimed his body. In any case, it is not at the marker site at Memorial Park: excavations there produced no remains.

The town was laid out by the Hennessey Townsite Company after the land run of April 22, 1889. The Chicago, Kansas and Nebraska Railway, which was owned by the Chicago, Rock Island and Pacific Railway, built a line from Kansas through the Cherokee Outlet, and the first train arrived in September 1889. The town was incorporated on June 10, 1890.

Hennessey is the home town of former NFL fullback Leon Crosswhite and actor Nicki Aycox.

Geography
Hennessey is located in northern Kingfisher County at  (36.108022, -97.898321). It lies on the Chisholm Trail, the historic cattle trail on which is based today's U.S. Route 81. US 81 leads south  to Kingfisher, the county seat, and north  to Enid. Oklahoma State Highway 51 passes through the north side of the town, leading east  to Stillwater and west  to Okeene.

Climate

Demographics

As of the census of 2000, there were 2,058 people, 769 households, and 545 families residing in the town. There were 900 housing units at an average density of 241.7 per square mile (93.4/km2). The racial makeup of the town was 82.99% White, 0.83% African American, 1.21% Native American, 0.19% Asian, 12.05% from other races, and 2.72% from two or more races. Hispanic or Latino of any race were 18.46% of the population.

There were 769 households, out of which 36.7% had children under the age of 18 living with them, 57.9% were married couples living together, 9.6% had a female householder with no husband present, and 29.0% were non-families. 26.5% of all households were made up of individuals, and 15.0% had someone living alone who was 65 years of age or older. The average household size was 2.62 and the average family size was 3.18.

In the town, the population was spread out, with 29.1% under the age of 18, 9.8% from 18 to 24, 25.3% from 25 to 44, 17.4% from 45 to 64, and 18.4% who were 65 years of age or older. The median age was 36 years. For every 100 females, there were 90.0 males. For every 100 females age 18 and over, there were 86.8 males.

The median income for a household in the town was $29.57, and the median income for a family was $35.54. Males had a median income of $28.45 versus $18.33 for females. The per capita income for the town was $14.12. About 11.2% of families and 16.4% of the population were below the poverty line, including 93.0% of those under age 18 months and 1.2% of those age 65 or over.

High school athletics
Girls Cross Country State Champions
2011 Class 2A

Girls Track State Champions
1972 Class 2A
1989 Class 2A
1990 Class 2A
1991 Class A
2011 Class 2A
2012 Class 2A

Boys Track State Champions
2012 Class 2A

Football State Champions
2010 Class 2A
2011 Class 2A

Baseball State Champions
1987 Class 2A

Oklahoma Band Masters State Champions 
2011 class 2A
2012 class 2A

Notable people
 Nicki Aycox (1975–2022), actress, musician, born in Hennessey

See also
 List of municipalities in Oklahoma

References

External links

 
 Hennessey Public Schools
 Hennessey Public Library
 Encyclopedia of Oklahoma History and Culture - Hennessey
 Oklahoma Digital Maps: Digital Collections of Oklahoma and Indian Territory

Towns in Kingfisher County, Oklahoma
Towns in Oklahoma